Adiantum tenerum, common name brittle maidenhair fern, is a species of maidenhair fern belonging to the family Pteridaceae.

Distribution
This fern species is native to Florida (United States), Mexico, Puerto Rico, Cuba, Jamaica, Bahamas, Costa Rica, Nicaragua, Colombia, Brazil, and Venezuela.

It is restricted to moist, shaded, limestone ledges and grottoes.

Description 
Adiantum tenerum grows in a creeping position. Leaves are light green, pinnate, fan-shaped, glabrous, arching or pendent, about as long as broad.

References

External links
JSTOR Global Plants: Adiantum tenerum

tenerum
Ferns of the Americas
Ferns of Brazil
Ferns of Mexico
Ferns of the United States
Flora of Central America
Flora of the Caribbean
Flora of the Bahamas
Flora of Costa Rica
Flora of Florida
Flora of Jamaica
Flora of Puerto Rico
Flora of Trinidad and Tobago
Flora of Venezuela
Flora of the Yucatán Peninsula
Taxa named by Olof Swartz